Rockport is a ghost town in Farmington Township, Rooks County, Kansas, United States.

History
Rockport was issued a post office in 1873. The post office was discontinued in 1905.  There is nothing left of Rockport.

References

Former populated places in Rooks County, Kansas
Former populated places in Kansas
1873 establishments in Kansas
Populated places established in 1873